1997 Yokohama Marinos season

Competitions

Domestic results

J.League

Emperor's Cup

J.League Cup

Player statistics

 † player(s) joined the team after the opening of this season.

Transfers

In:

Out:

Transfers during the season

In
Masahiro Fukazawa (loan return from River Plate on June)
Petković (from OFK Beograd on August)
Kazumasa Kawano (from Nagoya Grampus Eight)
Kazunari Okayama (from Hatsushiba Hashimoto Senior High School)

Out
Masaharu Suzuki (to Nagoya Grampus Eight)
Hideki Matsuki
Sotaro Yasunaga (loan to Lleida on August)

Awards
J.League Best XI: Masami Ihara

References
J.LEAGUE OFFICIAL GUIDE 1997, 1997 
J.LEAGUE OFFICIAL GUIDE 1998, 1996 
J.LEAGUE YEARBOOK 1999, 1999

Other pages
 J. League official site
 Yokohama F. Marinos official site

Yokohama Marinos
Yokohama F. Marinos seasons